Aspatharia divaricata is a species of freshwater mussel in the family Iridinidae. It is endemic to Lake Victoria in Tanzania.

References

Unionida
Invertebrates of Tanzania
Molluscs described in 1897
Taxonomy articles created by Polbot